The Little Village Foundation was founded in 2014 by Jim Pugh as a 501(c)(3) organization based in Solvang, California. Pugh is a veteran keyboard player who has toured the world with Robert Cray and Etta James (see Stickin' to My Guns). Little Village Foundation (LVF) is non-profit company in the music industry that produces and distributes what it considers to be culturally significant recordings made by individuals and groups that might otherwise not be heard beyond the artists' community or family.
The label serves an access point for previously overlooked artists who retain their intellectual property and album sales through their work with the organization. The artists come from widely varied and sometimes non-traditional backgrounds. Pugh and his find and secure talent to sign and record, and several of the musicians have roots that extend to other nations, including Mexico, India, Russia and the Philippines.

Discography 
LVF released its batch of four CDs in 2015. Four more followed in 2016, and seven more have followed in both 2017 and 2018. Most are released in the summer to coincide with an artists' showcase on Fourth Of July weekend at the Waterfront Blues Festival in Portland, Oregon.

2015 releases 
 David Ellis With Any Luck But Bad (western/folk musician from Bakersfield, California)
 Los Tres Amigos Snuviko's When the Clouds Descend (musicians from Santa Maria, California, who sing and play in the Mixtec language of their native Oaxaca, Mexico)
 Ron Thompson's Son Of Boogie Woogie (Oakland, California, bluesman)
 Wee Willie Walker's If Nothing Ever Changes (Memphis-born soul-blues artist based in Minneapolis, Minnesota)

2016 releases 
 John "Blues" Boyd's The Real Deal (Mississippi-born San Francisco-area bluesman)
 Aireene Espiritu's Back Where I Belong (Filipino-American Californian who sings some tunes in Tagalog)
 Aki Kumar's Aki Goes To Bollywood (Bay Area-based blues harmonica player from Mumbai, India, who sings in Hindi)
 Mariachi Mestizo's Te Doy La Libertad (16 high school students from Delano, California)
 Wee Willie Walker's Live! Notodden Blues Festival Norway (October release)

2017 releases 
 Sean Wheeler's Sand In My Blood (Salton Sea Legend of The Desert) 
 Chris Cain's Chris Cain (San Jose, California, born blues multi-instrumentalist)
 Xochtil Morales' Descansos (LVF's first spoken-word album – the poetry of a member of Mariachi Mestizo)
 The Sons Of The Soul Revivers' Live! Rancho Nicasio (traditional gospel quartet singing)
 Maurice Tani's The Lovers Card (alt-country artist from San Francisco)
 Paul DeLay's 1997 Live At Notodden (blues)
 Howell Devine's HOWL (Bay Area country blues and jazz)

2018 releases 
 Ada Pasternak's Sweet Dreams (Violinist and singer-songwriter – recorded with and a tribute to her parents Rayhan and Igor, with whom she migrated to the U.S. from her native Russia) 
 Aki Kumar's Hindi Man Blues (A fusion of blues and Bollywood with liner notes from blues harmonica player Charlie Musselwhite)
 Kevin Burt's Heartland And Soul (Debut recording from Iowa-based guitarist/harmonica player who captured top honors in three categories at the 2018 International Blues Challenge)
 Marcel Smith's' Everybody Needs Love (Debut solo album from veteran gospel vocalist)
 Mariachi Mestizo's XX Aniversario (Mariachi follow-up to 2016 debut album)
 United By Music North America's Yes We Can Can (blues, swing, jazz and rock-'n'-roll performed by professionals and musicians with autism and other developmental disabilities they mentor through their international non-profit organization)
 Various Artists Raise Your Voice (Collection of music and spoken-word pieces about school safety delivered by survivors of the Marjory Stoneman Douglas High School massacre in Parkland, Florida, and others from other parts of the U.S., including the following songs/works by the following high school students:  "Shine", by Sawyer Garrity and Andrea Peña; "Raise Your Voice", by Madison Yearsley; "Save Me", by Tyler Jenkins; "A Poem for the Fallen", spoken word by Saida Dahir; "Renegades", by Amalia Fleming; "The Truth: We Need Change", by the AP Music Class from John W. Lavelle Preparatory Charter School; "17", by Ben Soto; "The Separation", by Ashlyn Flamer and Christopher Doleman; "Little Princess", by Tyler Suarez; "Freedom", by Nina Lee; and "We Can", by students from St. Paul High School for the Performing Arts)
 Whitney Shay's A Woman Rules The World (San Diego-based blues vocalist)

2019 releases 
 Anai Adina's Esperame En El Cielo (Harvard-bound multi-instrumentalist daughter of mariachi stars Leticia and Juan Morales)
 Betty Reid Soskin's A Life of Being Betty (Spoken-word account of the African-American experience as seen through the eyes of America's oldest active Park Ranger)
 Junior Watson's Nothin' to Do But to Do It (Jump blues from guitarist who's worked and recorded with Canned Heat, Big Mama Thornton, George "Harmonica" Smith, Charlie Musselwhite, Jimmy Rogers, Pee Wee Crayton, and many more)
 Marina Crouse's Never Too Soon (Bay Area Mexican-American blues, R&B and jazz vocalist)
 Maurice Tani's This Is It (Alt-country artist recorded live at the Freight & Salvage Coffeehouse in Berkeley, California)
 Mary Flower's Livin' with the Blues Again (Piedmont and lap steel stylings from Oregon-based singer/songwriter)
 The Mike Duke Project's ...Took a While (Debut Southern soul release from pianist/songwriter who penned major hits for Huey Lewis & the News in the 1980s and was a longtime member of the Delbert McClinton Band)
 Saida Zahir's The Walking Stereotype (Poetry from 18-year-old Somali refugee now living in Salt Lake City, Utah, with guest appearances from R&B bassist Jerry Jemmott and Tonight Show Band percussionist Vicki Randle)
 Skip The Needle's We Ain't Never Going Back (Debut release from all-female R&B band founded in Oakland, California, in 2014 and anchored by Randle)

2020 releases 
 Casey Van Beek and the Tulsa Groove's Heaven Forever (Dutch-born, Los Angeles-raised 1960s rocker and former Grammy nominee with the country-rock band The Tractors delivers a mix of blues, country and rockabilly in a style known as the Tulsa Sound.)
 Ron Thompson's From the Patio: Live at the Poor House Vol. 1 (recorded in San Jose, California, in 2014 and released as a tribute a few months after Thompson's passing due to complications of diabetes.)
 The Sons Of The Soul Revivers' Songs We'll Always Sing (The second Little Village release from the quartet, which bridges gospel, soul and early rock 'n' roll.)
 Nic Clark's Love Your Life: Songs for the Whole Family (Debut release for Colorado-born, Bay Area-based singer/songwriter/multi-instrumentalist featuring contributions from longtime Little Richard drummer Derrick Martin and Atlantic Records session bassist Jerry Jemmott.)
Sonny Green's Found! One Soul Singer (Best-known for the song "Jody's on the Run", this Los Angeles-based, Louisiana-bred has been singing contemporary Southern soul music since the late 1960s.)
 20x20: The LVF Singer Songwriter Compilation (20 artists in multiple fields contributed one song each to this collection. All of the material was recorded at home during the COVID-19 crisis with minimal backing. The roster includes Aireene Espiritu, Alabama Mike, Be Steadwell, David Jackson, Genesis Fermin, Ira Marlowe, John Arthur Bigham, Jim Bruno, Joe Rut, Kofy Brown, Lisa Leuschner Andersen, Margaret Belton, Marina Crouse, Maurice Tani, Nic Clark, Rachel Garlin, Sean Wheeler, Roger McNamee, Vicki Randle and Wendy Beckerman.)

2021 releases 
 Aaron Lington'''s 4 Bari x Bach (San Jose State University professor/coordinator of jazz studies reinterprets Bach chorales on baritone saxophone)
 Aki Kumar's Zindagi: Live It Your Way (Single blues release with Bollywood overtones)
 Gary Vogensen's Shot of Hope (Bay Area singer-songwriter's first solo release in 19 years. A former member of Angela Strehli's band, Blues Broads, he has been a touring musician for 40 years in a career that has included work with Commander Cody and the Lost Planet Airmen, Boz Scaggs, Steve Miller, Lloyd Price and more.)
 Tia Carroll's You Gotta Have It (First-ever U.S. release for Bay Area blues, rock and gospel singer)
Bobby Black's 70 Years of Swingin' Steel! (Retrospective from the pedal steel guitarist who was a longtime member of Commander Cody & the Lost Planet Airmen, Asleep at the Wheel and New Riders of the Purple Sage.)
Memphissippi Sound's Welcome to the Land (All-original debut release of duo formed by harmonica player Damion Pearson and percussionist Cameron Kimbrough that delivers contemporary one-string, trance blues, a form that was popular in the deep South in the pre-War era.)

 2022 releases 
 Diunna Greenleaf's I Ain't Playin  (2014 Blues Music Association Koko Taylor Award winner as female vocalist of the year returns to the studio for her first new solo release in 11 years.)
 Henry Kaiser and Rome Yamilov's The Lenoir Investigation (San Francisco-based ethnomusicologist/guitarist Kaiser teams with Russian-born Yamilov to re-imagine the music of the bluesman J.B. Lenoir.)
 Marina Crouse's Canto de Mi Corazon (Spanish-language release from fourth-generation Mexican-American Bay Area vocalist who revisits songs she heard as a youth.)
 Mighty Mike Schermer's Just Gettin' Good (Former Marcia Ball, Bonnie Raitt and Elvin Bishop guitarist delivers an original set of Texas and West Coast blues.)
 DaShawn Hunter's Drums, Roots & Steel (Debut album from a steel guitarist based out of Mt. Airy, North Carolina, delivering music culled from traditional Pentacostal-Holiness churches.)
 Phantom Blues Band's Blues for Breakfast (The fifth release under their own name for the group who have served as Taj Mahal's backing band since the 1990s. Composed of first-call sidemen, the lineup includes guitarist Johnny Lee Schell, bassist Larry Fulcher, percussionist Tony Braunagel, and horn players Joe Sublett and Darrell Leonard. Bonnie Raitt and Curtis Salgado make guest appearances with proceeds targeted for donation to the Mike Finnigan School of Music in Salina, Kansas, in honor of their keyboard player who succumbed to cancer prior to the release of this CD.)
 Maurice Tani's All In (Singer/songwriter teams with several LVF label mates and delivers an all-original set of tunes with linear storylines that include everything from alt country to R&B and roots.)

 2023 releases 
 Alabama Mike's Stuff I've Been Through'' (All-original set Southern soul, R&B, funk and blues from Alabama-born, Bay Area-based vocalist born Michael Benjamin.)

Notable events 
Following the release of their album, Mariachi Mestizo was invited to play in a showcase at Carnegie Hall in New York. The performance took place on April 10, 2017. The group also performed at New York's Lincoln Center in 2018.

Formed a partnership in 2020 with Arhoolie Foundation, the non-profit that continues the mission of Chris Strachwitz and his Arhoolie Records, joining together to co-produce "Working from Home", a series of concerts that provide a revenue stream for artists across the U.S. who are housebound because of coronavirus and unable to perform elsewhere. The shows are recorded and broadcast via social media with viewers contributing to virtual tip jars for each performance. All monies raised go directly to the artists involved, and LVF and Arhoolie provide matching funds for the first $500 raised per show. Ten shows were recorded in the series in 2020–21, including broadcasts from Seligstein and Horowitz of Veretski Pass, Casey Van Beek and the Delta Groove, John "Blues" Boyd, Aki Kumar and Rome Yamilov, Wilson Savoy, Mary Flower, Familia Longoria, The Sons of the Soul Revivers, Xochitl and Anai Morales, and C.J. Chenier.

References

External links 

 Official website

Organizations established in 2014
Music organizations based in the United States
Charities based in California
Organizations based in Santa Barbara County, California
Solvang, California
501(c)(3) organizations